Dynamic Sport (sometimes styled DynamicSport) is a Polish aircraft manufacturer based in Kielce. The company was founded in 1995 by the Polish Aero Club and Wojtek Pierzyński. It specializes in the design and manufacture of paramotors and powered parachutes in the form of ready-to-fly aircraft for the US FAR 103 Ultralight Vehicles rules and the European microlight category. At one time it produced a full line of paragliders.

History
The company was originally started by in 1994 as by Pierzyński as "TNT Sport". The Raven paraglider was the first product designed and produced before the company name was changed to Dynamic Sport and relocated to Kielce in 1995.

By 1996 the company had paramotors in series production using the ubiquitous Solo 210 motor.

After originally manufacturing paragliders from local materials that proved inferior, the fabric was switched to Porcher Marine. This resulted in higher prices but better performance and durability.

Rene Coulon, in reviewing the company in 2003, wrote, "very involved in the production of paragliders and paramotors, Dynamic is a soundly based company that knows where it’s going. With the growth of the European Community Poland will have access to an enormous market where their technical and intellectual capacity can be appreciated, especially with their very low prices at the moment."

In a 2011 review of the company by the Polish on-line aviation magazine, Lotniczapolska, the company at that time acted as a distributor for Walkerjet engines and reduction drives. The manufacturer did not supply parts in a timely manner, which resulted in criticism of Dynamic Sport. This was resolved by changing suppliers for the engines and drives.

Products
In the mid-2000s the company produced a full line of paragliders, including the Dynamic Sport Enigma, Gravis, Magnum, Raven and Viper, but by the mid-2010s had ceased production in favour of acting as a dealer for Advance Thun SA paragliders.

Aside from manufacturing paramotors, such as the now out-of-production Climber and Rocket, the company also provides flight training, including tandem flights, ballistic parachutes and services such as reserve parachute re-packing and aerial photography.

Independent testing of company paramotors by Lotniczapolska in field use resulted in praise for the product's durability.

Dynamic Sport became the Polish agent for the Scout Aviation SCOUT paramotor in 2015.

Aircraft

References

External links

Aircraft manufacturers of Poland
Ultralight aircraft
Polish brands
Paragliders
Paramotors
Companies established in 1995
1995 establishments in Poland
Kielce